The Great Conversation is a term describing a supposed phenomenon which some Roman Catholic apologists believe takes place in purgatory. They hold that souls arriving in purgatory after death will naturally converse with each other in an effort to determine where they are and how they got there. The impression is that of a large social gathering in which every participant has much the same questions on his or her mind.

Catholic tradition
According to mainstream Catholic teachings, purgatory is the process of purification in which the souls of those who die in a state of grace are made ready for Heaven. One common metaphor describes it as a place where the souls of all Christians go directly after death and where each remains until the soul is ready to be admitted to heaven. In this context, "The Great Conversation" will naturally occur in purgatory as a result of the deeply social nature of humankind: souls in purgatory will communicate with each other.  C.S. Lewis once wrote that heaven knows only two languages: silence and music, a notion which allocates additional importance to this final conversation.

In a 1982 Christian novel entitled Between Heaven and Hell,  author Peter Kreeft sheds some light on the notion of "The Great Conversation" by creating a fictional dialog in purgatory between three historical figures, namely John F. Kennedy, C.S. Lewis, and Aldous Huxley all three of whom had died on November 22, 1963. Since many of Kreeft's works involve similar themes (such as his "Socrates Meets..." series) this may suggest he is employing some sort of double meaning with the sense of the "Great Conversation" of the Western canon together with the Catholic sense of a conversation in purgatory.

Purgatory as a holding tank
Mainstream Catholic theology maintains that certain human actions can affect the purification process of the soul in purgatory. According to this theology, good works are held to reduce the degree of purification required, which every person's soul must undergo after death in order to stand in God's holy presence. On the other hand, venial sin will increase the degree of purification required in purgatory. Furthermore, mortal sins like murder and rape, if unrepented, lead a person's soul to be eternally damned with no option for purgatorial purification. "The Great Conversation" is the means by which the soul should be able to reflect upon the nature and significance of its actions while alive. "The Great Conversation" is presented as an opportunity to consult the collective advice of others while personally deciphering the quality of human morality on earth. Hence the emphasis on the importance of prayer for all those who have departed, especially since they are engaging in "The Great Conversation" while undergoing their final purification.

References

External links
 Catechism of the Catholic Church

Catholic theology and doctrine